LRTA may refer to:
 Light Rail Transit Association, a light rail transit advocacy group based in the United Kingdom
 Light Rail Transit Authority, a transit operator in Manila, Philippines
 Lowell Regional Transit Authority, a transit operator in Lowell, Massachusetts, United States